The Land is a pavilion located in the World Nature neighborhood of Epcot, a theme park at the Walt Disney World Resort in Bay Lake, Florida. The pavilion is dedicated to human interaction with the Earth, focusing on agriculture, conservation, and travel. It opened on October 1, 1982, as part of the Phase I features for the grand opening of what was then known as EPCOT Center. It explores how humans can both use the land for their benefit, and how they can also destroy it. Future Technology in better preserving the land is also explored in the pavilion, along with a focus on the celebration of the land itself.

The 24 hectare (2.5 million square foot) facility features four attractions; Soarin' Around the World, Living with the Land, Harvest Theater (including Awesome Planet), and Behind the Seeds Tour.

History

While "The Land" pavilion has existed since 1982, it has gone through three significant phases. The pavilion's first incarnation involved a ten-year sponsorship under Kraft Foods Inc. from 1982–1992. Kraft played a vital role in co-financing the everyday functions of the attractions, restaurants, and shops inside the pavilion. The pavilion's interior and exterior design featured earth tone colors and exotic plant life.

In 1993, plans were made to update and modernize the overall tone of EPCOT Center, including a major refurbishment of "The Land" pavilion. Kraft withdrew its sponsorship on September 26, 1992, with Nestlé taking Kraft's place officially on January 1, 1993.   Co-financed by Nestlé and the Walt Disney World Resort, a gradual refurbishment of the pavilion began on September 27, 1993.

The pavilion itself was cosmetically freshened. While some of the original design elements remained, the addition of more vibrant colors and fabrics to the various restaurants and shops gave the pavilion a more modern and refreshed look. The names of certain shops, restaurants, and attractions also changed during this time. The pavilion's main attraction, Listen to the Land, which took guests on connected boats through various exhibits within the pavilion, reopened mostly unchanged as Living with the Land on December 10, 1993.

The Kitchen Kabaret Revue, another of the pavilion's original attractions featuring an Audio-Animatronics presentation about nutrition, closed on January 3, 1994. It was replaced with a new show titled Food Rocks, which featured some of the elements from the original show with an updated presentation intended to be more modern and appealing to younger audiences.

Symbiosis, the last of "The Land"'s three original attractions, was closed on January 1, 1995. This attraction, which was a cinematic presentation that discussed both the positive and negative aspects of human relationship with the land, eventually reopened as Circle of Life: An Environmental Fable, a new film featuring characters from The Lion King. Like the Food Rocks show, this new attraction recycled some of the elements of its predecessor, and was intended to be another refreshed and modernized feature of "The Land" that would better appeal to younger audiences.

In 2003, Nestlé renewed its sponsorship of "The Land"; however, it was under agreement that Nestlé would oversee its own refurbishment to both the interior and exterior of the conservatory-style pavilion. Between 2004 and 2005, the pavilion underwent its second major refurbishment. It received a new color scheme featuring a vibrant selection of white, yellow, and green. New foliage was added to complement the existing greenery. The walkways and stroller parking to the pavilion's entrance were redefined and widened. All of the carpeting in the pavilion was replaced, and the main food court was completely redesigned. The pavilion's signage was updated, incorporating the new color scheme, new typography, and a modernized logotype.  The pavilion's original dedication plaque remained unchanged.

The most significant change to "The Land" during its 2004–2005 refurbishment was the closure and entire demolition of Food Rocks, which initially occurred on January 3, 2004. Taking its place would be Soarin', a major attraction that was originally designed and built for Disney California Adventure Park. Simulating the experience of hang gliding over various landscapes, Soarin's massive movie screens and ride mechanics required the construction of a large physical addition to the pavilion itself. Both Soarin' at Epcot and Lights, Motors, Action!: Extreme Stunt Show at Disney's Hollywood Studios opened to guests on May 5, 2005, coinciding with the start of Disney's Happiest Celebration on Earth Campaign. "The Land" officially reopened that same day. While "The Land" as a pavilion has somewhat changed, its purpose has not, and it remains a positive and serious experience featuring elements from all three of its phases, allowing today's guests to experience all that "The Land" has to offer.

On February 13, 2009, Nestlé pulled out of sponsorship, leaving "The Land" without a sponsor. 

"Living with the Land" was closed for a vehicle update from August 2, 2009, to October 2, 2009. This update increased passenger capacity from 36 to 40 guests per vehicle. Newer, more wheelchair-friendly vehicles were also a new addition.

On July 29, 2011, Chiquita signed on as the new sponsor for the ride Living with the Land. However, it is not mentioned in-ride by the narrator (Mike Brassell) nor does it have a VIP lounge in The Land building itself.

Horticulture research
In addition to being an entertainment venue, "The Land" is also a demonstration, production, and research facility. 43,000 ft² (0.4 hectares) of the pavilion are dedicated to experimental horticulture techniques in hydroponics, irrigation methods, and integrated pest management.

Services

Current attractions

 Soarin' Around the World—A flight motion simulator that takes guests hang gliding over various regions of the world including the Great Wall of China, Monument Valley, Great Pyramids of Egypt, Sydney Harbour, and the plains of Africa.
 Living with the Land—A narrated boat tour about ecology and agriculture that takes guests through an indoor dark ride portion and an outdoor greenhouse and hydroponics lab, revealing the crops and animals cultivated for use at Epcot. 
Harvest Theater (1982-)
Awesome Planet—A 4D film about the Earth's biomes and the perils of climate change, with narration by Ty Burrell.
 Behind the Seeds Tour—For an extra fee, an approximately 1 hour long tour of the research facility that explains what is being researched, and how the research is conducted.

Current dining
 The Garden Grill - Family restaurant with a farm house atmosphere, which includes a rotating seated area, offering a view of the dark ride section of Living with the Land. The revolving floor had remained stationary for several months over the spring of 2014, and despite rumours of a permanent stoppage, the floor returned to operation from June 17, 2014.
 Sunshine Seasons - A food court
 Asian Shop - A variety of noodle bowls and stir-fries.
 Sandwich Shop - A variety of made to order sandwiches.
 Soup/Salad Shop - A variety of soups and salads.
 Wood-Fired Grill Shop - Rotisserie chicken, beef and fish.
 Bakery - Nestlé Toll House cookies, ice cream, among others.
  Breakfast - Breakfast here offers pastries, and combos that include eggs, one choice of bacon or sausage, and a drink.

Current shopping
 Soarin' Tour Desk - A desk, located to the left of the entrance to Soarin', where Guests may sign up for the Behind the Seeds Greenhouse Tour, which takes place in the greenhouse section of the Living With The Land attraction. Guests may also purchase Mickey's Mini Gardens, tiny plants produced through tissue culture in nutrient gel and packaged in sterile tubes.
 Green Thumb Emporium - A small merchandise area, located across from the Soarin' Tour Desk. A small assortment of Soarin' T-shirts and pins, along with disposable cameras and Mickey's Mini Gardens are available for purchase. Note that this shop has taken on the name of the former, much larger, shop at The Land which occupied the same approximate area.

Former attractions

 Listen to the Land (October 1, 1982 - September 27, 1993) - A boat ride about agriculture. Replaced with Living with the Land.
 Kitchen Kabaret (October 1, 1982 - January 3, 1994) - An audio-animatronics stage show about nutrition. Replaced with Food Rocks.
 Food Rocks (1994 - January 3, 2004) - An audio-animatronics stage show about nutrition, featuring parodies of classic songs. Replaced with Soarin'.
Harvest Theater  (1982-present)
 Symbiosis (October 1, 1982 - January 1, 1995) - A film about symbiosis. Replaced with Circle of Life: An Environmental Fable.
 Circle of Life: An Environmental Fable (January 21, 1995 - February 3, 2018) — A film about Simba describing symbiosis to Timon and Pumbaa. Replaced with Awesome Planet.
 Soarin' Over California (May 5, 2005 - June 16, 2016) - A motion simulator attraction cloned from Disney California Adventure taking you over various regions of California.

Former dining
 The Good Turn Restaurant (October 1, 1982 - May 1, 1986) - The original name of the present Garden Grill Restaurant.
 The Land Grille Room (May 2, 1986 - November 15, 1993) - The second name given to the present Garden Grill Restaurant.
 Farmer's Market (October 1, 1982 - October 25, 1993) - The name of "The Land's" original food court.
 The Sunshine Season Food Fair (1994–2004) - The second name given to "The Land's" food court.
 Ice Cream - Nestlé Toll House cookies, ice cream, among others.
 Potato Store - A variety of potato dishes.
 Pasta - A variety of pasta dishes.
 Soup/Salad - A variety of soups and salads.
 Barbecue - BBQ chicken and beef.

Former shopping
 Broccoli & Co. - Original shop alongside Kitchen Kabaret. Sold merchandise of said attraction, including magnets, plush and other souvenirs related to the pavilion.
 The Green Thumb Emporium - Second gift shop; small but with a focus on food and gardening.

Facts and figures
 Capacity: 3,600 persons
 Size: 253,780 square feet (24,000 m²) Roughly the size of Fantasyland in the Magic Kingdom of Walt Disney World.
 Sponsor(s): Kraft Foods Inc. (October 1, 1982 - September 26, 1993), and Nestlé (September 27, 1993 - Early 2009)

See also
 List of Epcot attractions

References

External links

 Walt Disney World Resort - The Land Pavilion
 Walt Disney World Resort - Living with the Land
 Walt Disney World Resort - Soarin'
 Walt Disney World Resort - The Garden Grill Restaurant
 Walt Disney World Resort - Behind the Seeds at Epcot
 The Land Pavilion Photo Gallery

Walt Disney Parks and Resorts attractions
Epcot
Future World (Epcot)
World Nature
Kraft Foods
Nestlé
1982 establishments in Florida
Buildings and structures with revolving restaurants